Minga Porá is a district of the Alto Paraná Department, Paraguay.